Ihor Stepanovych Nasalyk (born 25 November 1962 in Oleksandriia, Kirovohrad Oblast) is a Ukrainian optoelectronic engineer and politician. Nasalyk served as Minister of Energy and Coal Industry of Ukraine from 2016 until 2019.

In 1995–1998, he was a president of production corporation "Tekhno-Center" (Tekhnoinvestcenter) in Rohatyn.

A former mayor of Kalush.

In the 2019 Ukrainian parliamentary election Nasalyk lost reelection as an independent candidate in single-seat constituency 85 (Ivano-Frankivsk Oblast).

References

External links

1962 births
Living people
People from Oleksandriia
University of Lviv alumni
Ukrainian electronics engineers
Third convocation members of the Verkhovna Rada
Fourth convocation members of the Verkhovna Rada
Eighth convocation members of the Verkhovna Rada
Ukrainian People's Party politicians
Independent politicians in Ukraine
Energy and coal industry ministers of Ukraine
Kalush, Ukraine
Mayors of places in Ukraine